Eametsa may refer to several places in Estonia:

Eametsa, Põhja-Pärnumaa Parish, village in Põhja-Pärnumaa Parish, Pärnu County
Eametsa, Tori Parish, village in Tori Parish, Pärnu County